Eulophia coddii is a species of plant in the family Orchidaceae. It is endemic to South Africa. Its natural habitats are subtropical or tropical dry shrubland and subtropical or tropical dry lowland grassland. It is threatened by habitat loss.

References

Endemic orchids of South Africa
coddii
Endangered plants
Flora of the Northern Provinces
Taxonomy articles created by Polbot